David Nichtern (born 19 February 1948) is an American songwriter and television composer, soundtrack artist and Buddhist teacher of the Shambala tradition of Chögyam Trungpa.

Biography
Born and raised in Manhattan, Nichtern is the son of Sol Nichtern, a prominent New York psychiatrist and writer, and Broadway producer Claire Nichtern, the first female Tony award winner. Having begun practicing music at age eight, he began his career as a professional musician during his college years at Columbia University. He served as director of sales for the New England Digital Corporation in the 1980s. He is the founder of music-marketing company Nudgie Music LLC, and its divisions Dharma Moon and 5 Points Records. He wrote the song "Midnight at the Oasis."

He has his own world/fusion band, Drala and has also released a solo record entitled From Here To Nichternity, which features five cuts that were originally cues on One Life to Live, in addition to an instrumental duet of "Midnight at the Oasis" featuring Michael Brecker. David Nichtern is also a member of The Beyman Bros, an instrumental trio featuring Nichtern, Christopher Guest and C.J. Vanston.

Beginning in 1970, Nichtern became a student of the Shambhala Buddhist tradition of Tibetan Buddhism, and was taught by the founder, Chogyam Trungpa Rinpoche. Nichtern has since become a senior teacher. Nichtern has been the Director of Expansion for Shambhala Training, and co-director of the Karme Choling Meditation Center in Vermont.

Nichtern's son, Ethan Nichtern, is a Buddhist teacher and author.

5 Points Records 
5 Points Records is a privately held label based in New York City founded by David Nichtern.  Its sister companies include the world-lifestyle label Dharma Moon, the custom label 5 Points V.I.P. and the music publishing company Nudgie Tunes.

The label's first release, the first installment of the Rare Elements series, brought together an eclectic mix of talent that involved original works by acclaimed musician Ustad Sultan Khan being remixed by a variety of modern artists, including Thievery Corporation, Joe Claussell, Nickodemus And Osiris and others.

Their next release - Still Life by Kodomo - is a collection of minimal electro tracks representing a set of photos Kodomo took while traveling in Italy, Japan the US, China, etc. The album was released on October 7, 2008.

Other upcoming releases include the 2nd installment of their Rare Elements series featuring remixes of Omar Faruk Tekbilek by Amon Tobin, Junior Sanchez, Tommie Sunshine, Flosstradamus, and more.

Awards and nominations
Nichtern has been nominated for ten Daytime Emmy awards from 2000 to 2006, in the category "Outstanding Achievement in Music Direction and Composition for a Drama Series", for his work on One Life to Live and As the World Turns. He won the award in 2000, for One Life to Live, 2001 for As the World Turns, and 2005 for One Life to Live. He has also been nominated for a Grammy award for Song of the Year for "Midnight at the Oasis."

His first DE nomination was shared with Sybil Costello, Pamela Magee, James Kowal, Gary Deinstadt, Robert Bard, Billy Barber, Earl Rose, Rick Rhodes, Robert Sands, Ed Dzubak, Kevin Bents, Jamie Lawrence, and Bette Sussman. His first win was shared with Paul Glass, Jamie Howarth, Dominic Messinger, Kevin Bents, Lee Holdridge, Bette Sussman, and Rob Mounsey.

Composing credits
 The Student Teachers (1973)
 White Line Fever (1975)
 Sapphire Man (1988)
 The Big Picture (1989)
 One Life to Live (1995–2007)
 As the World Turns

Soundtrack credits
 The Big Picture (1989)
 Perfect Witness (1989)

References

External links
 DavidNichtern.com
 
 David Nichtern at Emusic.com
 Tampa Tribune article on OM yoga CD

1948 births
Living people
People from Manhattan
American male composers
21st-century American composers
American male songwriters
Emmy Award winners
21st-century American male musicians
The Beyman Bros members
Buddhist artists
Columbia University alumni